Makhoul is a surname. Notable people with the surname include:

Ameer Makhoul, Israeli Palestinian Christian convicted in 2011 of espionage
Issam Makhoul (born 1952), Israeli Arab politician
John Makhoul, Lebanese-American computer scientist
 Leena Makhoul (born 1993), Palestinian singer-songwriter